James Finley Wilson (August 28, 1881 – February 18, 1952) was a newspaperman, leader of the Elks fraternal organization for African Americans, held appointed public office, and was an influential community leader among African Americans. He was a Republican. He wrote The mockery of Harding : an open letter published in 1922 and The colored Elks and national defense. He studied at Fisk University. He led the Improved Benevolent and Protective Order of Elks of the World.

Wilson grew up in Nashville, Tennessee and graduated from Pearl High School.

Emory Libraries have several photographs of him.

He married Lea Belle Barrar of Richmond, Virginia in 1924.

References

External links
Photo of an obituary on Flickr

Fisk University alumni
People from Nashville, Tennessee
1881 births
1952 deaths